The 1973 South Carolina Gamecocks football team represented the University of South Carolina as an independent during the 1973 NCAA Division I football season. Led by eighth-year head coach Paul Dietzel, the Gamecocks compiled a record of 7–4. The team played home games at Williams–Brice Stadium in Columbia, South Carolina.

Schedule

Roster

References

South Carolina
South Carolina Gamecocks football seasons
South Carolina Gamecocks football